Fausto Sbaffoni is an Italian poet and writer born in Rome, Italy, living and working in Firenze.

Biography 
Fausto Sbaffoni is an Italian writer and poet who lives in Florence. He took philosophy at the University La Sapienza of Rome and received a doctorate in theology at the University of Friborg. Padre Fausto Sbaffoni, of the convent of San Marco in Florence, directs the magazine “Rivista di Ascetica e Mistica” and the biblioteca “Arrigo Levasti”. In 2010, he promoted with La Pergola Arte e Peter Michael Musone the poetic encounter with the poets Duccia Camiciotti and Fausto Sbaffoni "From Florence to the Stars"  at the "Consiglio regionale della Toscana", Palazzo Panciatichi, Via Cavour, Florence. In 2011, he promoted the anthology One Hundred Voices to the Sky and presented at the "Consiglio regionale della Toscana".

Published works

References

21st-century Italian poets
Living people
Writers from Florence
1952 births